Erikson Carlos Batista dos Santos (born February 26, 1995), known as Tiquinho, is a Brazilian footballer who plays for Finnish club Klubi 04.

Career

Club
On 9 March 2019, Tiquinho signed for HIFK.

On 21 January 2022, he joined Klubi 04 for the 2022 season.

References

External links

1995 births
Living people
Brazilian footballers
Association football forwards
Rio Branco Esporte Clube players
Rio Branco Atlético Clube players
SC Sagamihara players
HIFK Fotboll players
Kotkan Työväen Palloilijat players
Klubi 04 players
J3 League players
Veikkausliiga players
Brazilian expatriate footballers
Expatriate footballers in Japan
Brazilian expatriate sportspeople in Japan
Expatriate footballers in Finland
Brazilian expatriate sportspeople in Finland
Kakkonen players
Footballers from Belo Horizonte